Anbe Odi Vaa is a 1984 Indian Tamil-language film produced and directed by R. Renjith Kumar. The film stars Mohan and Urvashi. It was released on 12 May 1984.

Plot 

Prema transfers to a college in the same town as college student Mahesh. She is rich and harbours a deep sense of entitlement. Mahesh is reserved and primarily focused on his education as well as excelling in running track. He politely ignores Prema the few times they meet which enrages her. She makes it a point to reach out to him and fosters a friendship. Mahesh soon falls in love with Prema and she becomes the focus of life. Prema plays along in an attempt to get revenge. She finally comes clean when Mahesh risks his life to save her. Prema apologises and states that while she respects him, she doesn't love him. She's set to marry another man and walks out of his life. Years later, Mahesh is a professor in Bombay and befriends one of his students, Priya (Indira). In a visit to her house, he realises Priya's older sister is Prema. After leaving him, Prema gets in an accident and is disfigured which stops her marriage. Embarrassed by her looks, she's been a recluse and has had a lot of time to think about her actions. When the two meet again, Prema realises that she does love Mahesh but is reluctant to tell him given their history. Mahesh is still in love with Prema and writes her a letter expressing his desire for them to unite. Unfortunately, Priya gets the letter and assumes that Mahesh loves her. Prema learns the truth and finds herself in a bind as she doesn't want to hurt her sister or Mahesh. The three must find themselves out of this odd triangle.

Cast 
Mohan as Mahesh
Urvashi as Prema
Indira as Priya
Major Sundarrajan as Prema's uncle
P. R. Varalakshmi as Mahesh's sister
Bindu Ghosh as Vanji
Junior Balaiah as Ilavarasu
Loose Mohan as Bus conductor
Vennira Aadai Moorthy as Bus Driver
Manorama as Bus Conductor
Typist Gopu as Professor

Soundtrack 
The soundtrack is composed by Ilaiyaraaja. For the dubbed Telugu version Love Story, all songs were written by Rajasri.

Reception 
Jeyamanmadhan of Kalki criticised Renjith Kumar's direction, but praised his cinematography.

References

External links 
 

1980 films
1980s Tamil-language films
1984 films
Films scored by Ilaiyaraaja